Bridgend is a village on the Inner Hebrides island of Islay off the western coast of Scotland at the tip of Loch Indaal. The village is within the parish of Killarow and Kilmeny.

The island's two main roads, the A846 and A847, meet in the village just north of the bridge over the River Sorn that gives the village its name. The A846 passes through the village on its route between Port Askaig and Ardbeg. The A847 begins in Bridgend and continues to Portnahaven.

It is notable as the location of Islay House.

References

External links 

Islay Woollen Mill

Villages in Islay